Nese (or Arnafjord) is a village in Vik Municipality in Vestland county, Norway. The village is located on the shore of the inner part of the Arnafjorden in the eastern part of the municipality.  This is the site of Arnafjord Church, where there has been a church since the 1600s. This village was historically the main village around this fjord, with a shop, post office, and steamship stop. Today the population has declined to that of a very small village.

There is only one road that leads to Nese, and the village is at the end of the road. There are no other roads leading further west in the municipality.

History
On the night of 2 December 1811, there was a large rock slide from the mountain immediately west of Nese, which sent large rocks and boulders falling and rolling right through the small village, and killing 45 people (out of the 60 or so that were living there). Most of the bodies were swept into the fjord and never recovered.

References

Villages in Vestland
Vik